Interchange is a 2016 Malaysian-Indonesian fantasy thriller film directed by Dain Iskandar Said and starring Shaheizy Sam, Nicholas Saputra, Prisia Nasution, Alvin Wong, and Iedil Putra.

The film premiered in the Locarno International Film Festival on 5 August 2016 and was released in Malaysian cinemas on the 1st of December of the same year.

Plot

Cast
 Iedil Putra as Adam
 Shaheizy Sam as Detective Man
 Nicholas Saputra as Belian
 Prisia Nasution as Iva
 Nadiya Nisaa as Sain
 Alvin Wong as Detective Jason
 Chew Kin Wah as Heng
 Junad M. Nor
 Kaka Azraff as Melur

Production
Dain Iskandar had written the draft of the script in a matter of three weeks while he was editing the footage for Bunohan in Bangkok, Thailand.

References

External links
 
 Official webpage on Apparat Films

2016 films
2010s fantasy thriller films
Malaysian fantasy thriller films